Mahlaing is a town in the Mandalay Division of central Myanmar.

External links
Satellite map at Maplandia.com

Township capitals of Myanmar
Populated places in Mandalay Region